Orlagh Cassidy is an American actress.

Career
Cassidy made her Broadway debut in Present Laughter with Frank Langella in 1996. She portrayed  Nancy Pelosi, Speaker of the House, in the play The Adult in the Room, a Broadway Factor NYC world premiere written by Bill McMahon and directed by Heather Arnson and Conor t Bagley, which premiered at the Victory Gardens Theater in Chicago.

She appeared off-Broadway in Bright Ideas at MCC; on Broadway in Our Country's Good and "Present Laughter"; regionally in Richard III" (Lady Anne) with Richard Thomas, Mark Lamos directing; and in The Misanthrope at Philadelphia Drama Guild, among other productions.

Cassidy later played Doris Wolfe on Guiding Light (1999–2000, 2001, 2002, 2004–2009).

She narrated the 2013 TV series Desperate Measures.

Accolades
Cassidy received a nomination for the 2007 Drama Desk Outstanding Actress in a Play for the Off-Broadway production of  "The Field" at The Irish Rep.

Filmography

Television
 Ghostwriter (1992) ("Over a Barrel"; 1992–1993)
 Another World as Sloane Wallace (1992–1993)
 Murder One ("Chapter Twenty-One") (1996 episode); "Chapter Twenty-Two" (1996 episode)
 Trinity ("In Loco Parentis") (1998 episode)
 Guiding Light as Doris Wolfe (1999–2000, 2001, 2002, 2004–2009)
 Sex and the City ("Defining Moments") (2001 episode)
 Law & Order: Special Victims Unit ("Wrath') (2001 episode)
 Law & Order ("Star Crossed") (2003 episode)
 Unforgettable ("The Island") as Shelly Miller (2014 episode)
 Blue Bloods as Anne Carter (2012) (Season 2, Episode 19:"Some Kind of Hero")
 Desperate Measures (2013), narrator
 Homeland as Rachel (2017) (Season 6, Episode 7: "Imminent Risk")
 Madam Secretary as Regina Boroumand (2017) (Season 4, Episode 18: "The Friendship Game")

Film
 Passing Stones (2001)
 Confection (2003)
 The Pornographer: A Love Story (2004)
 The Great New Wonderful (2005)
 St Vincent as speech therapist (2014)
 Shirley as Caroline (2020)
 The Pale Blue Eye as Mrs. Fry (2022)

References

External links

American soap opera actresses
American stage actresses
American television actresses
American people of Irish descent
Living people
Place of birth missing (living people)
21st-century American women
Year of birth missing (living people)